The Liberty Bell Classic was a track and field athletics event organized by the Athletics Congress as part of the 1980 Summer Olympics boycott and held at Franklin Field at the University of Pennsylvania in Philadelphia on July 16 and 17, 1980. It was named after Philadelphia's Liberty Bell.

The U.S. Congress voted $10 million to fund alternative tournaments in several Olympic sports, to which athletes from boycotting countries would be invited. In addition to the Liberty Bell Classic, the U.S. Gymnastics Federation held an International Invitational tournament in Hartford, Connecticut. Earlier in the year, the United States had considered holding other games in Côte d'Ivoire, Italy, Japan, West Germany, or China.

The IAAF prohibited any official track and field meets that would clash with the Olympic meet, so the Liberty Bell began three days before the Moscow Games opened (and ten days before the Olympic athletics events began). The Liberty Bell came the day after the prestigious Bislett Games in Oslo, and many eligible athletes declined to compete, including 17 of the 34 champions at the US Olympic Trials. The winning performances in the men's 110 m hurdles and 400 m hurdles were better than those in Moscow.

Participants
Athletes from 29 countries participated in the event, many of which had taken part in the American-led boycott of the 1980 Summer Olympics, including:

Countries marked with an asterisk (*) went on to be represented in the 1980 Summer Olympics under the Olympic flag.

Medal summary

Men's events

Women's events

See also
 1980 Summer Olympics boycott
 1980 in athletics (track and field)
 1980 World Championships in Athletics
 Athletics at the Friendship Games, 1984 events in Moscow and Prague as part of the 1984 Summer Olympics boycott
 Politics and sports
 Goodwill Games

References

Sources
Olympic Boycott Games
The Olympic Games and Modern history

Citations

1980 in athletics (track and field)
Boycott Games
International sports boycotts
Penn Quakers
Sports competitions in Philadelphia
University of Pennsylvania
1980 in sports in Pennsylvania
Track and field competitions in the United States
Track and field in Pennsylvania
July 1980 sports events in the United States
1980s in Philadelphia